Paavo Kuusinen (2 December 1914 – 31 October 1979) was a Finnish cyclist. He competed in the team pursuit event at the 1948 Summer Olympics.

References

External links
 

1914 births
1979 deaths
People from Hämeenlinna
People from Häme Province (Grand Duchy of Finland)
Finnish male cyclists
Olympic cyclists of Finland
Cyclists at the 1948 Summer Olympics
Sportspeople from Kanta-Häme